Airheadz was a UK trance production duo based in London, comprising Leigh Guest and Andrew Peach. They were later joined by Caroline De Batselier who acted as vocalist and live performer.

History 
Although the two members of the group had worked together before under different aliases, the name 'Airheadz' was first used in 2000 on the 12" white label trance track "In the Air" and was subsequently used for a number of trance productions and remixes between 2000 and 2003.

Airheadz are best known for the trance hit single "Stanley (Here I Am)" which first came into existence as a bootleg record entitled "Stanley - Stanley's in a Trance Mix" due to it containing a vocal sample from Eminem's "Stan", and which itself was a sample taken from Dido's "Thank You". The 'Stanley's in a Trance Mix' rapidly became popular on the UK and European club scene and national radio circuit during late 2000 to early 2001, but as a consequence of being unable to acquire legal clearance for the use of Dido's vocal segment, the track ultimately was not able to get an official release.

In spring 2001, the track was re-released under AM PM Records as "Stanley - Here I Am" with the Dido sample having been removed and replaced with an entirely new vocal segment (Caroline De Batselier), modifying the feel of the track quite profoundly. In April 2001, the official (modified) version reached a peak position of No. 36 on the UK Singles Chart and is currently listed in the Top 100 trance anthems of all time.

Discography

Singles 
 2000: "In the Air"
 2001: "Stanley (Stanley's in a Trance Mix)"
 2001: "Stanley (Here I Am)" - UK No. 36

Remixes 
 2000: Charlie - "Burn and Shiver"
 2000: Apex - "Virtuoso" (Airheadz Mix)
 2001: Stargazers - "Is There Anybody Out There?" (Airheadz Mix)
 2001: Move - "Come Together"
 2003: Sur Le Mer featuring Sandy - "HI-NRG"
 2003: Jamie West - "Venus"
 2007: Farley Jackmaster Funk - "Love Can't Turn Around"

References

External links
 

British trance music groups
English electronic music groups
Electronic dance music duos
Musical groups established in 2000
AM PM Records artists